Vicente is a crater on Mercury. Its name was adopted by the International Astronomical Union (IAU) in 1979. Vicente is named for the Portuguese writer Gil Vicente.

To the north of Vincente is the crater Sibelius, and to the south is Rimbaud.

References

Impact craters on Mercury